This is a list of the members of the third Northern Ireland Assembly elected on 7 March 2007 or subsequently co-opted. The third term was the first in the Assembly's history to run to completion.

Party strengths

Graphical representation

MLAs by party
This is a list of MLAs elected to the Northern Ireland Assembly in the 2007 Northern Ireland Assembly election, sorted by party.

† Co-opted to replace an elected MLA

‡ Changed affiliation during the term

MLAs by constituency
The list is given in alphabetical order by constituency.

† Co-opted to replace an elected MLA
‡ Changed affiliation during the term

Changes since the election

† Co-options

‡ Changes in affiliation

References

External links
 Membership of the Northern Ireland Assembly

 
Lists of members of the Northern Ireland Assembly